The 1904 United States presidential election in Florida was held on November 8, 1904. Voter chose five representatives, or electors to the Electoral College, who voted for President and Vice-President.

Background
With the disenfranchisement of African-Americans by a poll tax in 1889, Florida become a one-party Democratic state, which it was to remain until the 1950s, apart from the anti-Catholic vote against Al Smith in 1928. Unlike southern states extending into the Appalachian Mountains or Ozarks, or Texas with its German settlements in the Edwards Plateau, Florida completely lacked upland or German refugee whites opposed to secession. Thus Florida's Republican Party between 1872 and 1888 was entirely dependent upon black votes, a fact graphically seen when one considers that – although very few blacks in Florida had ever voted within the previous fifty-five years – at the time of the landmark court case of Smith v. Allwright, half of Florida's registered Republicans were still black. Thus disfranchisement of blacks and poor whites left Florida as devoid of Republican adherents as Louisiana, Mississippi or South Carolina.

Nevertheless, Florida's one-party Democratic rule was to be marginally interrupted in the 1900s by considerable Socialist and Populist growth, centred in Tampa and Jacksonville, and southern Lee County with its "Koreshan Unity" sect Immigrants and farmers fearing loss of tenure were able to give Eugene Debs, in the second of his five Presidential runs, over ten percent of the vote in several counties of South Florida, and Populist Thomas E. Watson substantial votes in many pineywoods counties. However, this did not threaten the Democrats' monopoly on statewide power except in Calhoun County which Democratic nominee Alton Parker held by just two votes and William Jennings Bryan was to lose in 1908.

Results

Results by county

Notes

References 

1904
Florida
1904 Florida elections